The South Asia Olympic Council (SAOC) formerly known as South Asian Sports Federation, is the governing body of South Asian Games, South Asian Beach Games and South Asian Winter Games. The South Asia Olympic Council is a sports body that looks after sports ties among the South Asian Association for Regional Cooperation.

History
South Asian Games Federation (SAGF) was formed officially in 1983. In 2004, in 32nd meeting of South Asian Sports Federation held at Islamabad (Pakistan), it was decided to rename it to its current name i.e. South Asia Olympic Council.

The SAOC headquarters is located in host city of future South Asian Games and the President of NOC hosting the SAG holds the position of SAOC President. Its current President is Lieutenant-General Syed Arif Hasan from Pakistan.

SAOC Presidents
As per the Constitution of SAOC, the President of NOC hosting the next South Asian Games is the president of SAOC.

Member countries
Following is the list of member countries of SAOC:

Former members
Following is the list of former member countries of SAOC:

See also
South Asian Games

References

South Asian Games
Sports governing bodies in Asia
Sports organizations established in 1983
1983 establishments in Asia